Lahoysk District (pronounced [lʌˈɣɔɪskɪ rʌɪon]; , English: Logoisk District) is a second-level administrative subdivision (raion) of Minsk Region, Belarus. Its capital is the city of Lahoysk.

Notable residents 

 Belarusian Jewish writer Źmitrok Biadula(1886 - 1941) was born in this area (Pasadžec village)
 Nil Hilevich (1931, Slabada village – 2016), Belarusian poet

See also
 Khatyn massacre

References

 
Districts of Minsk Region